Joseph Gaggero CBE, GMH, KHS, KFO,  (20 November 1927 – 10 February 2012) was a Gibraltarian businessman. He was president of The Bland Group of Companies, which concentrate their business in shipping, aviation and travel.

Early and personal life
Joseph Gaggero was born in Gibraltar on 20 November 1927, to Sir George Gaggero OBE JP and Mabel Andrews-Speed. He was educated at Worth School, West Sussex and later at Downside School, Bath. He married Marilys Healing in 1958 and had a son and a daughter. He was later married to Cristina Russo from 1994 to 2008. In his spare time he enjoyed painting and travel. Gaggero was also a member of the Travellers Club in London and Valderrama Golf Club in San Roque.

Career
Gaggero was president of the Bland Group, an international travel, shipping and tourism based group of companies comprising fifteen trading enterprises established in the United Kingdom and the Western Mediterranean (Spain, Gibraltar and Morocco).

Charitable work
The Gaggero Foundation is an independent private charitable body established by his son James Gaggero through the Bland Group in 2008. The Foundation's purpose is to support and initiate programs that aid education, family welfare and community health. The Foundation encourages applications that are consistent with these aims, and has particular interest in supporting the geographic areas of Gibraltar, Morocco and Andalusia.

Other activities and honours
He was a director of the Gibraltar Chamber of Commerce between 1951 and 1956, Head of Gibraltar Tourist Board 1955–59.  Gaggero also served on or led various other Government committees and Gibraltar Trading Associations. He was appointed Honorary Vice Consul for Sweden in Gibraltar 1958 (under his father Sir George Gaggero, Consul with title of a Consul General), Consul 1967 and Consul General 1973.  Resigned in 1996.

Gibraltar Philharmonic Orchestra
KHS (Vatican), Commander, 
Royal Order of the Polar Star (Sweden) 1991
President British Moroccan Soc,  Liveryman, GAPAN 1997+
Patron, Hispanic British Foundation, 1999
Publication: Running with the Baton (autobiog), 2005
Commander, Royal Order Al Alaoui (Morocco), 2006
Inducted: Hall of Fame, Travel and Hospitality Industry, 2007
Awarded: UK Air League Founders Medal, 2007
Vice President Moroccan-British Business Council 2007+
Hon Vice President 2009
Awarded Gibraltar Medallion of Honour, 2009
KFO - Knight of the Royal Order of Francis I 2011

Death
Gaggero died on 10 February 2012 in London. The Gibraltar Chronicle broke the news on its Twitter service in the evening of the same day.

References

External links
 Bland Group official website
 Chatham House
 yacout.info
 The Peerage

1927 births
2012 deaths
Commanders of the Order of the British Empire
Commanders of the Order of the Polar Star
Gibraltarian people of English descent
British businesspeople
Gibraltarians
British Roman Catholics
People educated at Downside School
Bland Group